The 2018 Alpine Cup is a four-nation football tournament hosted in Mandalay, Myanmar from 1–5 August 2018.
The tournament is sponsored by Alpine purified drinking water. Myanmar, Thailand, and Bahrain compete as U-23 national team while South Korea does as U-19 national team.

Venues

Standings

Matches 
All times are local, Myanmar Time (UTC+6:30)

Goalscorers 

3 goals

 Um Wonsang

2 goals

  Abdula
  Choi Jun
  Lim Jaehyuk
  Yan Naing Oo 
  Suttisak

1 goal

  Mubarak
   Saleh
  Hasan Jaafar
  Choe Heewon
  Kim Janhyun
  Kim Seyun
  Aung Thu 
  Dway Ko Ko Chit 
  Myat Kaung Khant 
  Zaw Min Tun 
  Jakkit
  Jaroensak 
  Ratchanat

Prize money

References

2018 in Burmese football